Willis Blackshear Jr. is a Democratic member of the Ohio House of Representatives representing the 38th district. He was elected in 2020, defeating Republican John Ferrell Mullins III with 79% of the vote. Prior to his election the Ohio House, Blackshear worked in the Montgomery County Auditor's Office as an outreach specialist.

Ohio House of Representatives

Election
Blackshear was elected in the general election on November 3, 2020.

Committees
Blackshear serves on the following committees: Commerce and Labor, Criminal Justice, and Agriculture and Rural Development.

Election history

References

Wright State University alumni
Living people
Democratic Party members of the Ohio House of Representatives
21st-century American politicians
Politicians from Dayton, Ohio
African-American state legislators in Ohio
Year of birth missing (living people)
21st-century African-American politicians